The Election Funding Authority of New South Wales was the agency of the Government of New South Wales charged with administering the Elections Funding Act 1981. The Authority formerly distributed public funding for the purposes of campaigning by candidates in state elections and handles claims for payments from the state's Political Education Fund. On 1 December 2014 it was abolished and its functions made the responsibility of the NSW Electoral Commission.

Candidates for public office in New South Wales previously had obligations under the Election Funding, Expenditure and Disclosures Act 1981 to declare political donations, as well as expenditure on campaigning to the Authority. Disclosures were required to be made by 20 October each year.

The Authority was the responsibility of the Department of Premier and Cabinet.

See also

Elections in Australia
List of New South Wales government agencies

References

External links
Election Funding Authority of New South Wales

Defunct government entities of New South Wales
Elections in New South Wales
Political funding